The year 1922 in archaeology involved some significant events.

Excavations
 September - Excavations at Coldrum Long Barrow in south east England resumed by architect E. W. Filkins.
 November 4 - Howard Carter discovers Tutankhamun's tomb. He opens it in the presence of George Herbert, 5th Earl of Carnarvon and Herbert's daughter, Evelyn Beauchamp, on November 26.
 First excavations of Neolithic remains at Windmill Hill, Avebury, England.
 Excavations at Ur by the British Museum and the University of Pennsylvania led by Leonard Woolley begin.
 Excavations at Euphrates, site of Dura-Europos, by Franz Cumont.
 Excavations at the Temple of Olympian Zeus (Athens).
 Excavations at Sutton Courtenay Anglo-Saxon village in England by Edward Thurlow Leeds.

Explorations
 Aerial survey of archaeological sites in south western England by Alexander Keiller and O. G. S. Crawford.
 Mohenjo-daro rediscovered by Rakhaldas Bandyopadhyay of the Archaeological Survey of India.
 First of four successive American Museum of Natural History expeditions to Mongolia under Roy Chapman Andrews which will discover fossils of Indricotherium (a gigantic hornless rhinoceros then named "Baluchitherium"), Protoceratops, a nest of Protoceratops eggs (found in 1995 to be from Oviraptor), Pinacosaurus, Saurornithoides, Oviraptor and Velociraptor, none of which were known before.

Finds
 Venus of Lespugue.

Publications
 Alfred Watkins - Early British Trackways.

Births
 March 31 - Richard Daugherty, American archaeologist (d. 2014)
 July 12 - Michael Ventris, English co-decipherer of Linear B (d. 1956).
 August 3 - Su Bai, Chinese archaeologist of Buddhist grottoes (d. 2018)
 November 19 - Yuri Knorozov, Russian epigrapher of  Maya hieroglyphics (d. 1999).
 Kim Won-yong, "doyen of Korean archaeology" and Seoul National University professor (d. 1993).

Deaths
 November 23 - Eduard Seler, German Mesoamericanist (born 1849).

See also
 List of years in archaeology

References

Archaeology
Archaeology
Archaeology by year